Reilly Rocks is a cluster of rocks located 5 nautical miles (9 km) north-northwest of Detling Peak in the northwest part of Kohler Range, Marie Byrd Land. The name was applied by Advisory Committee on Antarctic Names (US-ACAN) in memory of Gerald E. Reilly, Jr., USCG. A machinery technician assigned to USCGC Glacier, he lost his life in an accident aboard the ship while it was in the Ross Sea en route from McMurdo Station to the Antarctic Peninsula, January 22, 1976.
 

Rock formations of Marie Byrd Land